Grand Hotel (German:Grand Hotel...!) is a 1927 German silent drama film directed by Johannes Guter and starring Mady Christians, Dagny Servaes and Günther Hadank.

The film's art direction was by Erich Czerwonski.

Plot summary

Cast
 Mady Christians 
 Dagny Servaes 
 Günther Hadank 
 Werner Fuetterer 
 Erna Morena 
 Frida Richard 
 John Mylong
 Otto Wallburg 
 Karl Platen 
 Paul Otto 
 Harry Hardt
 Heinrich Gotho

References

Bibliography
 Bock, Hans-Michael & Bergfelder, Tim. The Concise CineGraph. Encyclopedia of German Cinema. Berghahn Books, 2009.

External links
 

1927 films
Films of the Weimar Republic
Films directed by Johannes Guter
German silent feature films
UFA GmbH films
German black-and-white films
German drama films
1927 drama films
Silent drama films
1920s German films
1920s German-language films